María Alejandra Díaz is a Venezuelan politician. She served as a member of the 2017 Constituent National Assembly of Venezuela.

She graduated from the Universidad Santa María (Venezuela) in 1989.

She has caused controversy by making claims not supported by medical science to have found a cure for COVID-19.

References

Year of birth missing (living people)
Living people
21st-century Venezuelan politicians
21st-century Venezuelan women politicians
Universidad Santa María (Venezuela) alumni
People of the Crisis in Venezuela
Controversies in Venezuela